Corlăteşti may refer to several villages in Romania:

 Corlăteşti, a village in Cezieni Commune, Olt County
 Corlăteşti, a village in Berceni, Prahova